Darreh Zuleh (also Romanized as Darreh Zūleh, Darreh-ye Zūleh, and Darreh Zūlleh) is a village in Japelaq-e Gharbi Rural District, Japelaq District, Azna County, Lorestan Province, Iran. At the 2006 census, its population was 28, in 7 families.

References 

Towns and villages in Azna County